Mitchell Brown (born 18 August 1987) is a snowboarder and from New Zealand.He competed for New Zealand in the men's half-pipe events at the 2006 Winter Olympics at Turin, Italy and the 2010 Winter Olympics in Vancouver, British Columbia, Canada.

References

External links
 Mitch Brown at the NZOC website
 
 

1987 births
Living people
New Zealand male snowboarders
Olympic snowboarders of New Zealand
Snowboarders at the 2006 Winter Olympics
Snowboarders at the 2010 Winter Olympics